Carol Leigh (January 11, 1951 – November 16, 2022), also known as The Scarlot Harlot, was an American artist, author, filmmaker, and sex workers' rights activist. She is credited with coining the term sex work and founded the Sex Worker Film and Arts Festival and was the co-founder of BAYSWAN, the Bay Area Sex Worker Advocacy Network.

Early life and education
Leigh was born on January 11, 1951, in New York City and grew up in Jackson Heights, Queens. She later attended Binghamton University (1968–70) and Empire State College (1972–74), where she obtained a BA in creative writing. She also attended the Boston University MFA program for creative writing.

By 1978, Leigh moved to San Francisco and started engaging in sex work. Two years later she was raped by two men at the establishment she worked at. She did not report this to the police for fear of the establishment being shut down. Leigh later described the rape as a defining moment in her life that prompted her activism for sex workers' rights.

Activism
After moving to San Franscisco, Leigh joined COYOTE, a sex workers' rights organization, and became involved in its activities,  including as a spokesperson, and through the Coalition on Prostitution coordinated a street outreach project for street workers in San Francisco. She also co-founded BAYSWAN, the Bay Area Sex Worker Advocacy Network, in 1990, and was an original member of ACT UP. According to former ACT UP member Terry Beswick, "Carol was the fairy godmother of the early AIDS direct action groups of San Francisco. She was a character, always injecting an element of over-the-top satire into our protests and deliberations, with a devilish grin and a wink in her eye. Her sex-positive safer sex messages were way ahead of their time and were a blast of fun amidst all the doom and gloom."

In San Francisco, Leigh also joined the AIDS activist organisation Citizens For Medical Justice and collaborated with the Sisters of Perpetual Indulgence. In the 1990s, she was part of a San Francisco Board of Supervisors commission on prostitution. She was one of the main contributors to the San Francisco Task Force on Prostitution, whose report calling for the decriminalization of prostitution was published in 1996.

In 2006 Leigh received a grant from the Creative Work Fund to establish, in collaboration with the Center for Sex & Culture, the Sex Worker Media Library. In 2008, she prominently advocated for a San Francisco ballot initiative to decriminalize prostitution.

The term "sex work"
Leigh is credited with coining the term sex work at an anti-pornography conference in the late 1970s or early 1980s. The terminology used at the Women Against Violence in Pornography and Media conference for the sex industry was the "Sex Use Industry". The phrasing bothered her because it objectified sex workers and trivialized the agency they had in the transaction. She suggested the panel be renamed "Sex Work Industry" (later writing "because that described what women did") and began to use the term in her one-woman plays before the first published use of sex worker appeared in a 1984 Associated Press newswire. She explained in a 1997 essay titled "Inventing Sex Work" that: "I invented sex work. Not the activity, of course. The term. This invention was motivated by my desire to reconcile my feminist goals with the reality of my life and the lives of the women I knew. I wanted to create an atmosphere of tolerance within and outside the women's movement for women working in the sex industry."

Theater, television, and film
In the early 1980s, Leigh wrote her one-woman satirical play The Adventures of Scarlot Harlot. She performed in San Francisco and at the 1983 National Festival of Women's Theater in Santa Cruz. Her onstage persona was the "Scarlot Harlot", and she regularly performed at clubs and theaters, including the Great American Music Hall and the Holy City Zoo, as well as rallies and as part of the Sex Workers Art Show tour.

Leigh began making videos in 1985, and received awards from the American Film Institute for Yes Means Yes, No Means No; Outlaw Poverty, Not Prostitutes and Mother's Mink. Other films she directed and produced include the documentary Blind Eye to Justice: HIV+ Women in California Prisons, narrated by Angela Davis.

During the AIDS crisis in the United States, Leigh decided to leave San Francisco and move to Texas where she intended to form an educational  organization to promote safe sex: T.W.A.T. ("Texas Whores And Tricks"). Her car broke down in Tucson, Arizona, and she answered a classified ad from media-life-artist Dennis Williams, who had a weekly two-hour live comedy program on Tucson Western International Television (T.W.I.T.). Leigh joined the show and created and developed several characters for it. After two years Leigh returned to San Francisco.

The San Francisco Sex Worker Film and Arts Festival was founded by Leigh in 1999, which she also co-produced with Erica Elena and Jovelyn Richards.

Personal life and death
Leigh lived in San Francisco and was bisexual. She died of cancer on November 16, 2022, at age 71.

Her archives have been donated to the Schlesinger Library on the History of Women in America at Harvard University.

Works

Books

Book chapter

Film appearances
As listed by WorldCat.
 Annie Sprinkle's amazing world of orgasm (2004)
 Annie Sprinkle's Herstory of porn : reel to real
 Dr. Annie Sprinkle's How to be a sex goddess in 101 easy steps (1992)
 Mutantes : féminisme porno punk = Punk porn feminism (2011) (in French)
 Mutantes : punk porn feminism (2011)
 Our bodies, our minds (2005)
 Released : 5 short videos about women and prison (2001)
 Sphinxes without secrets : women performance artists speak out (1991)
 Straight for the money : interviews with queer sex workers (1994)

Videos produced
As listed by Western Connecticut State University.

 Die Yuppie Scum (1989) 30 min 
 Outlaw Poverty, Not Prostitutes (1989) 21 min 
 Safe Sex Slut (1987) 30 min 
 Spiritual Warfare: The G.H.O.S.T.* Campaign (1990) 28 min 
 Taking Back the Night (1990) 28 min 
 Whores and Healers (1990) 28 min 
 Yes Means Yes, No Means No (1990) 8 min 
 Whore in the Gulf (1991) 30 min

See also 
 AIDS Coalition to Unleash Power

Citations

General and cited references

External links
 San Francisco Sex Worker Film and Arts Festival
 Sex Worker Media Library

1951 births
2022 deaths
21st-century LGBT people
Activists from San Francisco
American prostitutes
American women's rights activists
Binghamton University alumni
Bisexual women
Boston University alumni
Deaths from cancer in California
Empire State College alumni
HIV/AIDS activists
LGBT people from San Francisco
Sex worker activists in the United States
Writers from New York City
Writers from San Francisco
American bisexual writers